Millerstown is an unincorporated community in Sandusky County, in the U.S. state of Ohio.

References

Unincorporated communities in Sandusky County, Ohio
Unincorporated communities in Ohio